In Christian theology, merit (Latin: meritum) is a good work done that is "seen to have a claim to a future reward from a graceful God". The role of human merit in Christian life is a point of dispute between Catholics and Protestants.

Within Christianity, both Catholics and Lutherans affirm that "By grace alone, in faith in Christ's saving work and not because of any merit on our part, we are accepted by God and receive the Holy Spirit, who renews our hearts while equipping and calling us to good works". The Catholic Church further teaches that "When Catholics affirm the 'meritorious' character of good works, they wish to say that, according to the biblical witness, a reward in heaven is promised to these works. Their intention is to emphasize the responsibility of persons for their actions, not to contest the character of those works as gifts, or far less to deny that justification always remains the unmerited gift of grace".

Roman Catholicism "speaks of merit in three distinct ways": condign merit (which God crowns freely), congruous merit (nonobligatory reward that may result in sanctifying grace), and supererogatory merit (given for doing above what a Christian is required).

Reformed doctrine, on the other hand, puts more emphasis on the merit of Christ that humans receive through divine grace. Protestants generally teach that merit can never be used to earn or achieve salvation: "Because Christians are justified by faith alone, their standing before God is not in any way related to personal merit. Good works and practical holiness do not provide the grounds for acceptance with God." "The only merit God accepts for salvation is that of Jesus Christ; nothing man can ever do could earn God's favor or add anything to the merit of Christ."

Catholicism 
In Catholic philosophy,  merit (as understood to be a property of a good work which entitles the doer to receive a reward), is a salutary act to which God, in whose service the work is done, in consequence of his infallible promise may give a reward (prœmium, merces).

Nature of merit
Merit exists only in works that are positively good.  The relation between merit and reward furnishes the intrinsic reason why in the matter of service and its remuneration, the guiding norm can be only the virtue of justice, and not disinterested kindness or pure mercy; for it would destroy the very notion of reward to conceive of it as a free gift of bounty (cf. Rom., xi, 6). If, however, salutary acts can in virtue of divine justice give the right to an eternal reward, this is possible only because they themselves have their root in gratuitous grace, and consequently are of their very nature dependent ultimately on grace, as the Council of Trent emphatically declares (Sess. VI, cap. xvi, in Denzinger, 10th ed., Freiburg, 1908, n. 810): "the Lord ... whose bounty towards all men is so great, that He will have the things, which are His own gifts, be their merits."

Ethics and theology clearly distinguish two kinds of merit:
 Condign merit or merit in the strict sense of the word (meritum adœquatum sive de condigno), and
 congruous or quasi-merit (meritum inadœquatum sive de congruo).

Condign merit supposes an equality between service and return; it is measured by commutative justice (justitia commutativa), and thus gives a real claim to a reward. Congruous merit, owing to its inadequacy and the lack of intrinsic proportion between the service and the recompense, claims a reward only on the ground of equity. This early-scholastic distinction and terminology, which developed in the controversies with the Pelagians and Semipelagians, were again emphasized by Johann Eck, the famous adversary of Martin Luther (cf. Greying, "Joh. Eck als junger Gelehrter," Münster, 1906, pp. 153 sqq.). The essential difference between meritum de condigno and meritum de congruo is based on the fact that, besides those works which claim a remuneration under pain of violating strict justice (as in contracts between employer and employee, in buying and selling, etc.), there are also other meritorious works which at most are entitled to reward or honour for reasons of equity (ex œquitate) or mere distributive justice (ex iustitia distributiva), as in the case of gratuities and military decorations. From an ethical point of view the difference practically amounts to this that, if the reward due to condign merit be withheld, there is a violation of right and justice and the consequent obligation in conscience to make restitution, while, in the case of congruous merit, to withhold the reward involves no violation of right and no obligation to restore, it being merely an offence against what is fitting or a matter of personal discrimination (acceptio personarum). Hence the reward of congruous merit always depends in great measure on the kindness and liberality of the giver, though not purely and simply on his good will.

In Christian theology, man possesses nothing of his own; all that he has and all that he does is a gift of God, and, since God is infinitely self-sufficient, there is no advantage or benefit which man can by his services confer upon him. Hence on the part of God there can only be question of a gratuitous promise of reward for certain good works. For such works he owes the promised reward, not in justice or equity, but because he has freely bound himself, i.e., because of his own attributes of veracity and fidelity. It is on this ground alone that we can speak of Divine justice at all, and apply the principle: Do ut des (cf. St. Augustine, Serm. clviii, c. ii, in P. L., XXXVIII, 863).

Conditions of merit

In Catholic teaching, for all true merit, there are seven conditions, of which four regard the meritorious work, two the agent who merits, and one God who rewards.

In order to be meritorious, a work must be morally good, morally free, done with the assistance of actual grace, and inspired by a supernatural motive.

As to the second requisite, i. e., moral liberty, it is clear from ethics that actions, due to external force or internal compulsion, can deserve neither reward nor punishment. It is an axiom of criminal jurisprudence that no one shall be punished for a misdeed done without free will; similarly, a good work can only then be meritorious and deserving of reward when it proceeds from a free determination of the will. This is the teaching of Christ (Matt., xix, 21): "If thou wilt be perfect, go sell what thou hast, and give it to the poor, and thou shalt have treasure in heaven."

The necessity of the third condition, i. e., of the influence of actual grace, is clear from the fact that every act meriting heaven must evidently be supernatural just as heaven itself is supernatural, and that consequently it cannot be performed without the help of prevenient and assisting grace, which is necessary even for the just. The strictly supernatural destiny of the Beatific Vision, for which the Christian must strive, necessitates ways and means which lie altogether beyond what is purely natural (see GRACE).

Finally, a supernatural motive is required because good works must be supernatural, not only as regards their object and circumstances, but also as regards the end for which they are performed (ex fine). But, in assigning the necessary qualities of this motive, theologians differ widely. While some require the motive of faith (motivum fidei) in order to have merit, others demand in addition the motive of charity (motivum caritatis), and thus, by rendering the conditions more difficult, considerably restrict the extent of meritorious works (as distinguished from merely good works). Others again set down as the only condition of merit that the good work of the just man, who already has habitual faith and charity, be in conformity with the Divine law, and require no other special motive.

The agent who merits must both be in the state of pilgrimage (status viœ) and in the state of grace (status gratiœ). By the state of pilgrimage is to be understood our earthly life; death as a natural (although not an essentially necessary) limit, closes the time of meriting. The time of sowing is confined to this life; the reaping is reserved for the next, when no man will be able to sow either wheat or cockle.  The opinion proposed by a few theologians (Hirscher, Schell), that for certain classes of men there may still be a possibility of conversion after death, is contrary to the revealed truth that the particular judgment (judicium particulare) determines instantly and definitively whether the future is to be one of eternal happiness or of eternal misery (cf. Kleutgen, "Theologie der Vorzeit", II, 2nd ed., Münster, 1872, pp. 427 sqq.). Baptized children, who die before attaining the age of reason, are admitted to heaven without merits on the sole title of inheritance (titulus hœreditatis); in the case of adults, however, there is the additional title of reward (titulus mercedis), and for that reason they will enjoy a greater measure of eternal happiness.

In addition to the state of pilgrimage, the state of grace (i. e., the possession of sanctifying grace) is required for meriting, because only the just can be "sons of God" and "heirs of heaven" (cf. Rom., viii, 17). In the parable of the vine Christ expressly declares the "abiding in him" a necessary condition for "bearing fruit": "He that abideth in me, and I in him, the same beareth much fruit" (John, xv, 5); and this constant union with Christ is effected only by sanctifying grace. In opposition to Vasquez, most theologians are of opinion that one who is holier will gain greater merit for a given work than one who is less holy, although the latter perform the same work under exactly the same circumstances and in the same way. The reason is that a higher degree of grace enhances the godlike dignity of the agent, and this dignity increases the value of the merit.

Merit requires on the part of God that he accept (in actu secundo) the good work as meritorious, even though the work in itself (in actu primo) and previous to its acceptance by God, be already truly meritorious. Theologians, however, are not agreed as to the necessity of this condition. The Scotists hold that the entire condignity of the good work rests exclusively on the gratuitous promise of God and his free acceptance, without which even the most heroic act is devoid of merit, and with which even mere naturally good works may become meritorious.

Lutheranism and Calvinism 
Martin Luther emphasized the merit of Christ by considering justification as entirely the work of God. When God's righteousness is mentioned in the gospel, it is God's action of declaring righteous the unrighteous sinner who has faith in Jesus Christ. The righteousness by which the person is justified (declared righteous) is not his own (theologically, proper righteousness) but that of another, Christ, (alien righteousness). "That is why faith alone makes someone just and fulfills the law," said Luther. "Faith is that which brings the Holy Spirit through the merits of Christ". Thus faith, for Luther, is a gift from God, and "...a living, bold trust in God's grace, so certain of God's favor that it would risk death a thousand times trusting in it." This faith grasps Christ's righteousness and appropriates it for the believer. He explained his concept of "justification" in preparation for the Council of Trent in his Smalcald Articles:

Luther opposed the view that the law is not intended for Christians in the Antinomian Controversy with Johannes Agricola.

In his 1532 Commentary on the Sermon of the Mount, Martin Luther criticized Catholic doctrine concerning condign merit. He noted that while the reward one gains from condign merit is much greater than that of congruent merit, the sort of good works said to attain each type of merit is similar. Luther thought it did not make sense that the two types of merit could be gained by similar actions when the benefit of condign merit is so much greater than the benefit of congruent merit.

According to the doctrine of Calvin (Instit., III, ii, 4) good works are "impurities and defilement" (inquinamenta et sordes), but God covers their innate hideousness with the cloak of the merits of Christ, and imputes them to the predestined as good works in order that he may requite them not with life eternal, but at most with a temporal reward.

Apart from earlier dogmatic declarations given in the Second Synod of Orange of 529 and in the Fourth Lateran Council of 1215 (see Denzinger, 191, 430), the Council of Trent upheld the traditional doctrine of merit by insisting that life everlasting is both a grace and a reward (Sess. VI, cap. xvi, in Denzinger, n. 809). It condemned as heretical Luther's doctrine of the sinfulness of good works (Sess. VI, can. xxv), and declared as a dogma that the just, in return for their good works done in God through the merits of Jesus, should expect an eternal reward (loc. cit., can. xxvi).

See also
Good works
Grace
Merit (Buddhism)

References

External sources
 Catholic Encyclopedia "Merit"

Salvation in Catholicism
Christian terminology